The 2005 Telus Cup was Canada's 27th annual national midget 'AAA' hockey championship, played April 18–24, 2005 at the Robert Guertin Arena in Gatineau, Quebec.  The Saskatoon Contacts defeated the host L'Intrépide de Gatineau 4–1 in the gold medal game to win the national title.  National Hockey League defencemen Luke Schenn and Eric Gryba were members of the Contacts' championship team.

At the start of the 2004-05 hockey season, Telus signed on as a premier sponsor of Hockey Canada.  As a result of the sponsorship agreement, the national midget championship was named the Telus Cup.  Until 2003, it had been known as the Air Canada Cup.

Teams

Round robin

Standings

Scores

Saskatoon 4 - Edmonton 3
Lévis 3 - Don Mills 1
Gatineau 6 - Cole Harbour 0
Lévis 3 - Saskatoon 3
Cole Harbour 5 - Edmonton 4 (OT)
Gatineau 3 - Don Mills 1
Don Mills 5 - Edmonton 4
Saskatoon 5 - Cole Harbour 1
Lévis 2 - Gatineau 1
Don Mills 3 - Cole Harbour 2
Lévis 4 - Edmonton 2
Saskatoon 4 0 Gatineau 2
Cole Harbour 4 - Lévis 3 (OT)
Saskatoon 7 - Don Mills 2
Edmonton 4 - Gatineau 0

Playoffs

Semi-finals
Saskatoon 3 - Don Mills 5
Gatineau 5 - Lévis 2

Bronze-medal game
Lévis 7 - Don Mills 3

Gold-medal game
Saskatoon 4 - Gatineau 1

Individual awards
Most Valuable Player: Dave Richard (Saskatoon)
Top Scorer: Kyle Bortis (Saskatoon)
Top Forward: Kyle Bortis (Saskatoon)
Top Defenceman: Eric Gryba (Saskatoon)
Top Goaltender: Bobby Nadeau (Lévis)
Most Sportsmanlike Player: Simon Danis-Pépin (Gatineau)

See also
Telus Cup

References

External links
2005 Telus Cup Home Page
Hockey Canada-Telus Cup Guide and Record Book

Telus Cup
Telus Cup
Ice hockey in Gatineau
April 2005 sports events in Canada
Ice hockey competitions in Quebec
2005 in Quebec